Zenia may refer to:

People
 Zenia Larsson (1922–2007), Polish-Swedish writer and sculptor of Jewish descent
 Zenia Mucha (born 1957), American business executive with The Walt Disney Company
 Zenia Stampe (born 1979), Danish politician
 Zenia Tsima (born 1986), Greek former volleyball player
 Salem Zenia (born 1962), Algerian writer

Other uses
 Zenia Khan, one of the five main characters of the Indian sitcom Kya Mast Hai Life
 Zenia (plant), a legume genus
 Zenia, California, United States, an unincorporated community

Feminine given names